Shadow in the Mirror is a crime novel by the American writer Robert Aiello set in contemporary Pittsburgh, Pennsylvania.

The story opens when an identical twin⎯a flame from Grant Montgomery's past⎯reenters his life, and he is soon implicated in the murder of the twins’ father, an old friend and mentor. Montgomery, the mentalist, must uncover a secret to reveal the murderer, but he is threatened by a beautiful psychopath who wants his love or his demise and a sadistic criminal with a score to settle.

Sources
Contemporary Authors Online. The Gale Group, 2006.

External links
 Author's website
 Pittsburgh Post-Gazette book review

2001 American novels
American crime novels
Novels set in Pittsburgh
Twins in fiction